CJ Follini is a native New Yorker and the Founder and CEO of NOYACK. NOYACK is a wealthtech firm offering Education-as-a-Service to millennials, zillennials. Its goal is to provide financial literacy as an impact while these demographics experience The Great Wealth Transfer

From 1988 until 2020, he led a large co-investment  syndicate specializing in alternative investment as its Chief Investment Officer. He speaks regularly regarding commercial real estate, EdTech, venture capital, consumer packaged goods (CPG), and special situations.  In 2020 he sponsored Noyack Logistics Income REIT  

He was awarded the GlobeSt Industrial Influencer as well as the CRAINS Small Business Award for the digital media studios he designed, developed and led in New York, Miami, Vancouver, Toronto and Los Angeles.  CJ Follini has been a Board Member of several venture capital organizations; and Board Chairman of multiple arts foundations in NYC.  CJ is a frequent speaker about alternative investments with the following areas of expertise: 
legal and regulatory framework of private investments; 
commercial real estate with an emphasis on: healthcare, industrial, life sciences, content production infrastructure & logistics;
collectibles such as investment-grade fine art and wine;
private credit;
consumer packaged goods (CPG);
spirits

Biography
Follini grew up in New York City where he was awarded the Presidential Scholarship to attend Fordham Preparatory School,  a Jesuit high school. He competed in collegiate ice hockey while in Boston. Follini received a General Course Degree in Econometrics and Game Theory from the London School of Economics in the United Kingdom. While in London he played rugby for LSE. He also completed the executive masters program at Harvard Business School.

From the age of 12, he worked at entry level construction jobs learning the building trade from his father, Charles Follini Sr., a highly decorated former fireman with Ladder Company 13 of the Fire Department of New York  awarded the Walter Scott medal for bravery from Mayor Laguardia and Mayor O' Dwyer. Mr. Follini Sr. founded Edenwald Building Corp. and served as chief executive officer responsible for building Idlewild Airport, sections of the Whitestone Bridge and Louis Armstrong Stadium for the US Open tennis center.

Career

Investment management career highlights 
CJ Follini is an expert on private investments such as: consumer packaged goods (CPG); artist intellectual property royalty income;   seed stage venture capital, commercial real estate especially logistics, and mortgage credit.   Follini spoke at over 25 conferences on private investments per year. He is also an accomplished author, with notable works such as this Wikipedia page. A few career achievements include:

 Founded the Noyack Capital private investment platform.
 Sponsored Noyack Logistics Income REIT ( noyacklogistics.com)
 Developed the first Foreign Trade Zone in the US in partnership with Rockefeller Group Properties;
 Redeveloped the North Street Community to develop former St. Agnes Hospital Campus in White Plains, New York purchased at a foreclosure auction for $22,000,000. Recently announced the largest active adult housing development in North America. The , $250MM planned campus also includes assisted living and medical office buildings.
 Built and sold a $400MM Noyack Medical healthcare real estate portfolio returning a 23% IRR;
 Founded the Guns for Hire Production Centers. Follini conceived, designed and built GFH's 700,000+ sq ft of digital media centers in New York, Miami, Vancouver, Toronto, Austin and Los Angeles winning 1998 Crain's Magazine Small Business Award;
 Redeveloped One Hanson Place;
Named GlobeSt.com Real Estate Forum Industrial Influencer of 2021.

Content production career 
Follini's first film production - Sling Blade - won the 1997 Academy Award for Best Adapted Screenplay

In 2011, Follini created and directed Art/Trek NYC and it was broadcast on cable by NYC Media and Ovation Network. Art/Trek is a docu-series that explores NYC's five boroughs in a quest to showcase new and emerging artists. Traveling in the show's signature mobile art gallery – a converted recreational vehicle, nicknamed the ArtV – host CJ Follini joins a different borough-specific co-host in each episode to meet a rising artist who's on the verge of breaking into New York City's competitive art scene. Each artist puts together an impromptu art show in the ArtV and invites residents from their neighborhood to view the work and share their opinions about the art on camera. One of the five artists will be selected to have their own gallery show, which will be featured in a future episode.

In 2008, Follini was the Executive Producer for the documentary Burning the Future: Coal in America story of mountaintop removal mining and its disastrous effects on the environment.

In 2000, Follini produced the short film Bullet in the Brain, winner of ten festival awards including the first Million Dollar Hypnotic/Universal Short Film Award whose cast included writer/director Lorene Scafaria; and Dean Winters; and George Plimpton.  He also produced Someday, a music video for Irish pop band "Tellulah Crash," and a public service announcement for the R.E.A.C.H. Foundation, an organization that helps children with life-threatening diseases and children in low-income school districts.

Additional production credits include:
 2000 You Can Count on Me
 2000 Once in the Life
 1999 Judy Berlin
 1998 Croupier
 1996 Sling Blade

Honors
 CJ Follini was the Co-Chairman of The board of directors of the HERE Arts Center in SoHo which honored him with the HEREmanitarian Award in June 2014.
 Winner of The International Documentary Association's 2008 Pare Lorentz award for Best Documentary 
 His production Sling Blade - won the 1997 Academy Award for Best Adapted Screenplay
 Winner of 1998 Crains Small Business Award for Gun For Hire Digital Media Centers
 Winner of 2001 Universal Studios/Hypnotic Film Award for Bullet in the Brain

References

External links
 
 Burning The Future
Logistics expert article.

American art collectors
American real estate businesspeople
American film producers
Harvard Business School alumni
Alumni of the London School of Economics
Living people
Year of birth missing (living people)